Eyam Museum or as it is locally known Eyam Plague museum is a local museum in the village of Eyam, located in the Peak District, Derbyshire, England.

Overview 
Eyam Museum opened on 23 April 1994 as a small museum on a single level. A model of a Derbyshire lead mine was added in 2002. The museum is staffed by volunteers. It is located in Hawkhill Road.

The museum's galleries present the history of Eyam since prehistoric times, with a special emphasis on the Plague that struck Eyam, known as the Eyam Plague, in 1665.

The Plague (1665) 
The museum largely dedicated to Eyam's famous history as a plague village during the bubonic plague of 1665.

Gallery

See also 
 List of museums in Derbyshire
 Derby plague of 1665
 Eyam Plague Village Website

References

External links 
 Eyam Museum website

Museums established in 1994
Museums in Derbyshire
Local museums in Derbyshire
Medical museums in England
Tourist attractions of the Peak District
History of Derbyshire
1994 establishments in England